Chociwel may refer to the following places:
Chociwel, a town in West Pomeranian Voivodeship in north-western Poland
Chociwel, Lower Silesian Voivodeship, a village in south-western  Poland
 Chociwel Wieś, a settlement in  Stargard County, West Pomeranian Voivodeship, in north-western Poland
 Chociwel Commune, an administrative district in Stargard County, West Pomeranian Voivodeship, in north-western Poland